The Buttless Chaps were a Canadian indie rock band from Victoria, British Columbia, Canada. The group played a hybrid of punk, new wave and alternative country music. Band members included Dave Gowans on vocals, guitar and banjo, Morgan McDonald on keyboards, Lasse Lutick on guitar and synthesizer, Torben Wilson on drums and Ida Nilsen on vocals, accordion, synthesizer and euphonium.

History
The Buttless Chaps were formed in 1998. In 1999 they released a self-titled CD. Their third album, Death Scenes I II III came out in 2001, and had a country rock theme.

In 2006 the band released Where Night Holds Light on Mint Records, and the album soon appeared on the campus and community radio charts. They were featured on CBC Radio 3's Sessions in June 2007.

In an interview on CBC Radio 3 on January 7, 2009, Dave Gowans announced that the band would be breaking up after completing their remaining touring commitments. The band members moved on to other projects: McDonald to his band Fond of Tigers, Nilsen to Great Aunt Ida and The Violet Archers, Wilson to Clean and Pristine the NOEX Castaway, and Gowans to Cloudsplitter. Today, Gowans and Lutick also own the Vancouver record store Red Cat Records.

In popular culture

A poster for The Buttless Chaps appears in the background of "We'd like to Thank the Academy", an episode (Season 5, Ep. 13) of USA's hit comedy, Psych.

The song "Outlaw" is featured in the movie "Rollercoaster"directed by Scott Smith.

"When it's Cold Outside" from the album Cartography plays briefly in the series premiere of the AMC TV show "Justified".

Discography
The Buttless Chaps (1998)
Tumblewire (1999)
Death Country Live (2000)
Death Scenes I II III (2001)
Experiments (2002)
Love This Time (2003)
Where Night Holds Light (2006)
Cartography (2008)

See also

Canadian rock
List of bands from Canada
List of Canadian musicians

References

External links
The Buttless Chaps at CBC radio 3

Musical groups established in 1998
Musical groups disestablished in 2009
Canadian indie rock groups
Musical groups from Victoria, British Columbia
Mint Records artists
1998 establishments in British Columbia
2009 disestablishments in British Columbia